Chalaion may refer to:
Chalai (Thessaly), a town in ancient Thessaly, Greece
Chalaeum, a town in ancient Locris, Greece